Color Force is an American independent film and television production company founded in 2007 by producer and film executive Nina Jacobson  after her 2006 termination as president of Disney's Buena Vista Motion Pictures Group.

Its films include the Diary of a Wimpy Kid and The Hunger Games series. Color Force signed a three-year "first-look" production deal with DreamWorks in December 2006. In 2012, Brad Simpson became partner. Later that year, Color Force signed a first-look deal with FX Productions. In 2014, the company signed a first-look deal with 20th Century Fox.

In 2017, Jacobson and Simpson appointed Nellie Reed as head of Color Force's television productions.

Filmography

Feature films

Upcoming films

Television

References

External links
 Color Force on Facebook
 Color Force on Backstage

Film production companies of the United States
American independent film studios